Brachychiton obtusilobus is a tree of the genus Brachychiton native to Cape Range National Park in Western Australia. It was described in 1988.

Notes

References

obtusilobus
Malvales of Australia
Trees of Australia
Ornamental trees
Drought-tolerant trees
Plants described in 1988